Mask is a 2015 South Korean television series starring Soo Ae, Ju Ji-hoon, Yeon Jung-hoon and Yoo In-young. It aired on SBS from May 27 to July 30, 2015 on Wednesdays and Thursdays at 21:55 for 20 episodes.

Plot
Byun Ji-sook is working as a sales clerk at a department store when she suddenly comes across her doppelgänger Seo Eun-ha. Whereas Ji-sook's family is hounded by loan sharks because of her father and brother's crippling debt, Eun-ha is the daughter of a congressman and fiancée of chaebol heir Choi Min-woo. Min-woo is the illegitimate son of the chairman of SJ Group and the company's presumptive heir, to the bitter resentment of the chairman's wife and her daughter, Min-woo's half-sister Mi-yeon. Despite his wealthy background, Min-woo had grown up without the love and warmth of family and friends, and his and Eun-ha's future marriage is understood by both parties to be a mutually beneficial business arrangement. He also doesn't know that the man Eun-ha is having an affair with is Mi-yeon's husband, the manipulative and ambitious Min Seok-hoon. Seok-hoon will stop at nothing to prevent his brother-in-law from being named successor, including conspiring with the latter's psychiatrist into gaslighting Min-woo and making him think he's going insane. But his plans go awry when Eun-ha ends up dead, so Seok-hoon threatens and blackmails Ji-sook into taking Eun-ha's place. As Min-woo begins to live in close quarters with Ji-sook, he is puzzled and intrigued by his new wife and how different she is from what he expected.

Cast

Main
Soo Ae as Byun Ji-sook/Seo Eun-ha
Byun Ji-sook is a sales clerk at SJ Group's department store. Seo Eun-ha (her doppelgänger) is congressman's daughter, Choi Min-woo's fiancée and Min Seok-hoon's lover.
Ju Ji-hoon as Choi Min-woo
Jeon Jin-seo as young Choi Min-woo
Illegitimate son of the chairman of SJ Group. Engaged to Seo Eun-ha.
Yeon Jung-hoon as Min Seok-hoon
Lawyer of SJ Group. Choi Mi-yeon's husband. Seo Eun-ha's lover. 
Yoo In-young as Choi Mi-yeon
Daughter of the chairman of SJ Group. Min Seok-hoon's wife.

Supporting

Byun Ji-sook's family
Jung Dong-hwan as Byun Dae-sung, Ji-sook's father
Yang Mi-kyung as Kang Ok-soon, Ji-sook's mother
Hoya as Byun Ji-hyuk, Ji-sook's brother

Choi Min-woo's family
Jeon Guk-hwan as Chairman Choi Doo-hyun, father of Choi Mi-yeon and Choi Min-woo
Park Joon-geum as Mrs. Song Sung-hee, Choi Mi-yeon's mother

Seo Eun-ha's family
Park Yong-soo as Congressman Seo Jong-hoon, Seo Eun-ha's father
Lee Jong-nam as Mrs. Lee Jung-seon, congressman's wife, Seo Eun-ha's stepmother

Others
Kim Byung-ok as Shim Bong-seo, loan shark
Jo Han-sun as Kim Jung-tae
Park Yeon-soo as Myung-hwa, Byun Ji-sook's co-worker, Byun Ji-hyuk's girlfriend
Hwang Seok-jeong as Hwang Mal-ja, Byun Ji-sook's co-worker
Park Jun-myeon as General manager Yeo, Byun Ji-sook's supervisor
Joo Jin-mo as Professor Kim, Choi Min-woo's doctor
Kim Ji-min as Kim Yeon-soo, Choi Min-woo's household's maid
Moon Sung-ho as Nam-chul, Choi Min-woo's household's butler
Cho Yoon-woo as Oh Chang-soo, Choi Min-woo's secretary
Oh Ha-nee as Club woman
Sung Chang-hoon as Bbul-te ("horn-rimmed")

Ratings

Key
-lowest rating episode
-highest rating episode

Awards and nominations

References

External links
 

Seoul Broadcasting System television dramas
2015 South Korean television series debuts
2015 South Korean television series endings
Korean-language television shows
South Korean melodrama television series
South Korean romance television series
Television series by Studio Santa Claus Entertainment